Jamie Mark Courtney (born 22 April 1988 in Ashington, Northumberland) is a former motorcycle speedway rider and current promoter from England.

Career
Courtney comes from a speedway family; His brother Scott and uncle Sean were both speedway riders before him, and his father Mark Courtney is a former England international. In 2002 he became British under-15 champion. He competed at the age of fifteen for Rye House Rockets, and the following year rode for Oxford Silver Machine Academy. He has also raced for Redcar Bears, Isle of Wight Islanders, and Workington Comets. 

In 2010, he rode for Glasgow Tigers on loan from King's Lynn Stars before returning to ride for King's Lynn towards the end of the season. In 2010 he signed for Leicester Lions, the team that his father rode for 126 times, for their return to speedway in the Premier League. After being released by Leicester mid-season he later joined National League team Dudley Heathens.

Management
In 2021, it was announced that Courtney would be the team promoter of the Oxford Cheetahs during 2022, who were returning to action at Sandy Lane for the first time since 2007.

References

1988 births
Living people
British speedway riders
English motorcycle racers
Cradley Heathens riders
Leicester Lions riders